Kayrat Zhumabekuly Nurdauletov (6 November 1982) is a retired Kazakhstani footballer.

Coaching career
In January 2022, Nurdauletov was appointed as an assistant manager to Srdjan Blagojevic at Astana.

Career statistics

International

Statistics accurate as of match played 10 September 2013

International goals

Honours

Club
Irtysh Pavlodar 
 Kazakhstan Premier League (2): 2002, 2003

Tobol
 Kazakhstan Cup (1): 2007

Astana
 Kazakhstan Premier League (1): 2014
 Kazakhstan Cup (2): 2010, 2012

References

External links

Living people
1982 births
Kazakhstani footballers
Association football midfielders
Kazakhstan international footballers
Kazakhstan Premier League players
FC Astana players
FC Irtysh Pavlodar players
FC Kairat players
FC Kyzylzhar players
FC Tobol players
FC Kaisar players
Sportspeople from Almaty